The Little Picacho Wilderness is a  wilderness area under the jurisdiction of the Bureau of Land Management. The wilderness is found in a southeast extension of the Chocolate Mountains adjacent to the Colorado River, in the southeastern part of California. It should not be confused with the Picacho Peak Wilderness which is located to the northeast.

The wilderness provides habitat for  wild burro, desert tortoise, spotted bat and desert bighorn sheep.

The Little Picacho Wilderness is one of a number of federally protected areas located north of Yuma, Arizona and south of Blythe, California in the Lower Colorado River Valley.

See also
 Little Picacho Wilderness flora
 Chocolate Mountains
 Indian Pass Wilderness

References

External links 
 
 
 
 
 

Protected areas of the Colorado Desert
Wilderness areas within the Lower Colorado River Valley
Protected areas of Imperial County, California
Bureau of Land Management areas in California
Protected areas established in 1994
1994 establishments in California